is a 1959 American science-fiction horror film. Shot in Japan, it was produced by George P. Breakston and directed by Breakston and Kenneth G. Crane from a screenplay by Walter J. Sheldon. Sheldon's script was based on Breakston's story which he originally titled The Split.

The film starred Peter Dyneley as a foreign correspondent in Japan who is given an experimental drug which causes an eye and eventually, a second head to grow from his shoulder. Tetsu Nakamura played the mad scientist, Dr. Suzuki, and Terri Zimmern his assistant, Tara. Jane Hylton also starred as Dyneley's wife.

Plot
American foreign news correspondent Larry Stanford has been working in Japan for the last few years, to the detriment of his marriage. His last assignment before returning to his wife in the United States is an interview with the renowned but reclusive scientist Dr. Robert Suzuki, who lives atop a volcanic mountain. During the brief interview, Dr. Suzuki amiably discusses his work on evolution caused by sporadic cosmic rays in the atmosphere, and professes that he has discovered a method for producing evolutionary change by chemical means. Suzuki serves Larry a secretly drugged libation, causing him to fall into a deep sleep. Announcing to Tara, his voluptuous assistant, that Larry is the perfect candidate for his latest evolutionary experiments, he injects an unknown substance into Larry's shoulder. Upon waking, Larry is oblivious to the true situation and accepts Suzuki's invitation to spend the next week vacationing with him around Japan. Over the next few days, Suzuki uses Tara as a beguiling distraction while conditioning Larry with mineral baths and copious amounts of alcohol, exacerbating the pain in Larry's shoulder.

Meanwhile, Larry's estranged wife has traveled to Japan to bring him back home with her. When confronted, Larry refuses to leave his new life of women and carousing. After a few drinks that night, Larry examines his painful shoulder to discover that a large eyeball has grown at the spot of Dr. Suzuki's injection. Becoming aloof and solitary, Larry wanders Tokyo late at night. He murders a woman on the street, a Buddhist monk and a psychiatrist, while slowly changing form, culminating in his growing a second head. Seeking a cure, Larry returns to Dr. Suzuki's laboratory, where Suzuki has just informed Tara that Larry has become "an entirely new species" and is beyond remedy. Entering the lab, Larry kills Suzuki and sets the building on fire as Tara flees. Following her to the rim of the volcano, Larry splits into two completely separate beings, one looking like his normal self, the other animalistically grotesque.

The monstrous second being grabs Tara, and throws her into the volcano. As Larry's wife and the police arrive, Larry pushes his other self into the volcano. Larry, in a state of collapse but returned to normal, is taken away by the police, although it remains unclear how much moral or legal responsibility he has for his violent actions. The movie ends as Larry's wife and the police superintendent discuss the good that remains in Larry.

Cast
 Peter Dyneley as Larry Stanford
 Jane Hylton as Linda Stanford
 Tetsu Nakamura as Dr. Robert Suzuki
 Terri Zimmern as Tara
 Jerry Ito as Police Supt. Aida
 Norman Van Hawley as Ian Matthews
 Toyoko Takechi as Emiko Suzuki
 Kenzo Kuroki as Genji Suzuki
 Alan Tarlton as Dr. H. B. Jennsen
 Shinpei Takagi as Temple Priest
 George Wyman as the Monster

Production
The Manster was an American production filmed in Japan, using a mostly Japanese crew and a number of Japanese actors. The Manster was shot in English. The film had several working titles, including Nightmare and The Two-Headed Monster. It was photographed by David Mason and edited by Kenneth G. Crane. Shinpei Takagi handled the special effects, George Wyman played the titular monster and Hirooki Ogawa composed the soundtrack.

Release
The Manster was released in Japan on July 10, 1959 in Tokyo.

Lopert Pictures released The Manster in the United States on March 28, 1962 as a double feature with Eyes Without a Face. In the United Kingdom, The Manster was released as The Split. The American Film Institute also states that the film premiered in the United States in San Francisco on March 28, 1962, at a run time of 72 minutes.
 
The film was shown on Elvira's Movie Macabre and later released on DVD.

Reception
In a contemporary review, the Monthly Film Bulletin reviewed a 67-minute version of The Manster titled The Split. The review called the film to be "a pathetic pot-boiler", "never frightening" and an "incredibly far-fetched rehash of all the ingredients of the convention SF-horror film". The review criticized the fact that the second head of the character appears to only "bob up and down on the actor's raincoated shoulder, only visible in night scenes and never in close-up".

In a retrospective review, AllMovie film critic Hal Erickson wrote, "Manster is a favorite among campy horror aficionados and for good reason as it is both unintentionally funny and genuinely creepy...Wait till you see the climax, with the hero battling himself on the edge of a live volcano".

Footnotes

References

External links
 
 
 
 
 Manster informational site at B-Movie Central (includes images and detailed character descriptions)

1959 horror films
American science fiction horror films
American black-and-white films
Fictional mutants
Mad scientist films
American monster movies
Films directed by George Breakston
Films produced by George Breakston
Films set in Japan
Films shot in Japan
1950s English-language films
1950s monster movies
Films directed by Kenneth G. Crane
Japan in non-Japanese culture